Silas Joseph Simmons (October 14, 1895 – October 29, 2006) was an American semi-professional and professional baseball player for African-American teams in the pre-Negro leagues era, and became the longest-lived major league player in history. The previous record was held by Red Hoff, who died at age 107 in 1998.

Early life 
Simmons was born in Middletown, Delaware.

Career 
Simmons was a five-foot-ten, left-handed pitcher/outfielder, and began playing for the Germantown Blue Ribbons, a semi-pro team, in 1911. In 1913, the Blue Ribbons became a professional team and were renamed the Homestead Grays, a team that quickly became a Negro leagues powerhouse.

In 1926, Simmons pitched for the New York Lincoln Giants of the Eastern Colored League and appeared in at least one game in 1929 for the New York-based Cuban Stars (East) of the Negro National League. During his career, Simmons played on the same team as Hall of Famer John Henry Lloyd and against Hall of Famers Judy Johnson and Biz Mackey. Simmons ended his baseball career soon after 1929.

Personal life 

Simmons was married in Philadelphia by Rev. John L. Lee on September 15, 1915 to Mary L. "Mamie" Smith (July 19, 1896 – ca. 1944). He and his wife Mary had five children and settled into life as a porter.

He later became an assistant manager at Rosenbaum's Department Store in Plainfield, New Jersey. After 29 years of marriage Mamie died ca. 1944.

In 1957, Simmons married his second wife, Rebecca Jones (1901 – August 20, 1997).

Simmons worked for R. J. Goerke Co. during the early 1960s, and was among the employees to receive an award for safety.

In 1971, he retired to St. Petersburg, Florida. After 40 years of marriage, Rebecca died at the age of 96 in 1997.

Rediscovery and death 

In the fall of 2005, David Allen Lambert a genealogist at the New England Historic Genealogical Society alerted fellow baseball historians associated with the Negro leagues, who proceeded to interview this link to early baseball. In May 2006, Dr. Layton Revel — founder of Texas-based Center for Negro League Baseball Research — met and interviewed Simmons.

Revel also organized a 111th birthday celebration for Simmons, in 2006, which included approximately 30 former Negro leagues players from around Florida. A plaque was presented to Simmons on his birthday on behalf of the Society for American Baseball Research. Simmons was also presented a team jersey with number "111" from the Tampa Bay Devil Rays.

Simmons died 15 days later at the Westminster Suncoast Nursing Home in St. Petersburg, having outlived all five of his children. At the time of his death Simmons had nine grandchildren, several great-grandchildren, and many great-great grandchildren.

Simmons is also one of the two known professional athletes to have been born in the 19th century and died in the 21st century, the other being Karl Swanson (1900-2002).

See also 
 Supercentenarian
 Karl Swanson
 Red Hoff

References

External links 

 and Seamheads
 - Biography of Silas Simmons from the Negro League Baseball Players Association website
 Article Silas Simmons' passing as announced by the Society of American Baseball Research
 New York Times article
 
 Obituary from the New York Times (incorrectly identifying Carl Boles as the presenter of the SABR plaque: this plaque was presented by David Allen Lambert)

African-American centenarians
American supercentenarians
Men supercentenarians
Homestead Grays players
Lincoln Giants players
Baseball players from Delaware
Baseball players from St. Petersburg, Florida
People from Middletown, Delaware
1895 births
2006 deaths
20th-century African-American people
21st-century African-American people